The 1936 World Table Tennis Championships mixed doubles was the tenth edition of the mixed doubles championship.  

Miloslav Hamr and Gertrude Kleinová defeated István Kelen and Mária Mednyánszky in the final by three sets to one.

Results

See also
List of World Table Tennis Championships medalists

References

-